A Good Kind of Nervous is the fourth album by The Lucksmiths released in 1997 on Candle Records (catalogue number LUCKY5.)

Track listing
"Caravanna" – 3:05
"Under the Rotunda" – 2:51
"Train Robbers' Wives" – 1:55
"World Encyclopedia of Twentieth Century Murder" – 3:42
"The Invention of Ordinary Everyday Things" – 2:55
"Punchlines" – 3:09
"Guess How Much I Love You" – 3:22
"Columns O' Steam" – 2:08
"Up" – 1:31
"Wyoming" – 2:57
"Little Athletics" – 5:57

References

The Lucksmiths albums
1997 albums